Norman Arnold Fox (May 26, 1911 – March 24, 1960) was an American author best known for Western stories and novels.  His stories were often set around actual events in Montana history and contained authentic detail for the period.  Norman's works were adapted into radio programs, live television and motion pictures.

Biography

Norman Arnold Fox was born May 26, 1911, in Sault Ste. Marie, Michigan to Alfred and Florence Pearl Fox.  The family moved to Montana in 1916 to homestead but eventually settled in Great Falls.  Norman developed a love of the Old West and began dabbling with writing while in high school.  He sold his first story in 1933 and turned to writing full-time in late 1937 when he lost his job due to the Great Depression.  While initially writing short stories for pulp magazines such as Western Story Magazine, Norman succeeded in having his first novel published in 1940.

For the rest of his life Norman continued writing short stories while publishing one to two novels per year.  His popularity was greatest in the mid–1950s when his stories were regularly filmed, "making the author a brief star of sorts to the film community" (Herzberg 2005).  The films made from his novels featured such stars as: Randolph Scott, Audie Murphy, Tony Curtis, and James Stewart.

Norman was in the prime of his career when his life was cut short by cancer.  He died on March 24, 1960, and is buried in Great Falls, Montana.

Works

Books

Films

Gunsmoke (1953) from the novel "Roughshod" (1951)
Tall Man Riding (1955) from the novel "Tall Man Riding" (1951)
The Rawhide Years (1955) from the novel "The Rawhide Years" (1953)
Night Passage (1957) from the novel "Night Passage" (1956)

References

External links
Norman A. Fox

1911 births
1960 deaths
People from Sault Ste. Marie, Michigan
People from Great Falls, Montana
American Western (genre) novelists
20th-century American novelists
American male novelists
Novelists from Michigan
Writers from Montana
American male short story writers
20th-century American short story writers
20th-century American male writers